Les Engagés (LE) is a centrist French-speaking political party in Belgium. The party originated in the split in 1972 of the unitary Christian Social Party (PSC-CVP) which had been the country's governing party for much of the post-war period. It continued to be called the Christian Social Party (PSC) until 2002 when it was renamed the Humanist Democratic Centre (CDH). It took its current name on 17 March 2022, and currently does not participate in any government.

History 
The PSC was officially founded in 1972. The foundation was the result of the split of the unitary Christian Social Party (PSC-CVP) into the Dutch-speaking Christian People's Party (CVP) and the French-speaking Christian Social Party (PSC), following the increased linguistic tensions after the crisis at the Catholic University of Leuven in 1968. The PSC performed particularly badly in the 1999 general election. This was linked to several scandals, such as the escape of Marc Dutroux and the discovery of dioxine in chickens (the PSC was a coalition partner in the Dehaene government). The decline in votes was also explained by declining adherence to Catholicism. The party was confined to opposition on all levels of government.

The party started a process of internal reform. In 2001 a new charter of principles, the "Charter of Democratic Humanism," was adopted and in 2002 the party adopted a new constitution and a new name, Humanist Democratic Centre.

On 17 March 2022, the party changed to its current name and political colors.

On 10 October 2022, Virginie Lefrancq, a Brussels MP, announced that she was leaving Les Engagés, feeling politically orphaned.

Ideology

The party considers itself to be a movement rather than a party, and calls for citizen-led initiatives and more engagement between the public and politicians.

The party has dropped all its Christian references and now defines itself as a party working for the "common good".

On its manifesto, the party supports NATO, the EU, secularism and LGBT rights. Les Engagés supports intensifying awareness and information campaigns on gender and homosexuality, as well as the reimbursement of gynecological and andrological care for trans people.

Presidents
2022–present Maxime Prévot

References

External links 

Francophone political parties in Belgium
Social liberal parties
Liberalism in Belgium
Liberal parties in Belgium
Political parties established in 2022
2022 establishments in Belgium
Member parties of the European People's Party
Centrist parties in Belgium